Miroslava Němcová (née Daňková; born 17 November 1952) is a Czech politician who served as 6th Speaker of the Chamber of Deputies of the Czech Republic from 2010 to 2013. She was a member of the Chamber of Deputies from 1998 to 2020. In 2020 she ran for Senate in Prague 1. She faced the incumbent Václav Hampl whom she defeated by large margin and became member of the Senate.

She also ran for leadership of the Civic Democratic Party (ODS) in 2002 and 2014 but was unsuccessful.

References

External links 
 Personal website 
 Official Chamber of Deputies website

1952 births
Living people
Civic Democratic Party (Czech Republic) MPs
Speakers of the Chamber of Deputies (Czech Republic)
Women legislative speakers
People from Nové Město na Moravě
Members of the Chamber of Deputies of the Czech Republic (2017–2021)
Members of the Chamber of Deputies of the Czech Republic (2013–2017)
Members of the Chamber of Deputies of the Czech Republic (2010–2013)
Members of the Chamber of Deputies of the Czech Republic (2006–2010)
Members of the Chamber of Deputies of the Czech Republic (2002–2006)
Members of the Chamber of Deputies of the Czech Republic (1998–2002)
Members of the Chamber of Deputies of the Czech Republic (1996–1998)
20th-century Czech women politicians
21st-century Czech women politicians
Civic Democratic Party (Czech Republic) Senators